USS Seneca has been the name of more than one United States Navy ship, and may refer to:

 , a gunboat in commission from 1861 to 1865
 , a minesweeper and patrol vessel in commission from 1917 to 1919
 , a barge in commission from 1917 to 1919
 , a tug in commission from 1943 to 1971

United States Navy ship names